Bloodfang was a story about a tyrannosaurus rex published in British comic Eagle, issues 116–127 and 129–158 (1984–85). It was written by John Wagner, under the pseudonym F. M. Candor, and illustrated by Jim Baikie (first series) and Carlos Cruz and Vanyo (second series). A one-episode story also appeared in the Eagle Holiday Special 1985.

Plot

First series

The first series (12 episodes, 38 pages) begins with Bloodfang hatching from his egg, 100 million years ago. He promptly kills his siblings, and is raised by his mother, Karka, until she is killed in a fight with the tyrannosaur pack leader, Blackheart, who happens to be Bloodfang's father. During the fight Bloodfang is wounded in the face by Blackheart, leaving him with permanent scars. Bloodfang flees, and becomes an outcast from the pack.

Forced to fend for himself, the young tyrannosaur initially struggles to survive, and nearly starves. His first meal without his mother's assistance consists of carrion. However, when other dinosaurs (four sauroctoni) try to steal his meal from him, he cunningly bides his time until they have gorged themselves, and then attacks them when, sleepy and bloated, they are vulnerable, killing two and driving the others away. Over the next four years he grows to become six metres tall and weigh ten tonnes, by which time he has learned to be a ferocious fighter, stronger than most adults of his species.

Bloodfang returns to his pack during mating season, and kills a rival male tyrannosaur to steal his harem of females. Bloodfang quickly establishes his status as one of the strongest of the pack, but backs down when challenged by Blackheart, who is still the leader.

Eventually, during a final reckoning, Bloodfang kills Blackheart and usurps him as leader of the pack, while the rest of the pack feast on Blackheart's corpse.

Second series

In the second series (30 episodes, 90 pages) time-travellers from 2150, hunting dinosaurs for meat with which to feed the people of the 22nd century, attack Bloodfang's pack. Bloodfang fights back, but is eventually captured, brought to 2150 and kept in a zoo. Escaping, he goes on a rampage, killing many humans, until he returns to his own time.

Carlos Cruz illustrated the first 22 episodes, and Vanyo the remaining eight.

Reprint
The first series was reprinted in the monthly comic Best of Eagle no. 6 (1988).

References
 Bloodfang entry at ComicVine

See also
Flesh (comics), a series about dinosaurs and time-travel in 2000 AD, also published by IPC Magazines.

Eagle comic strips
Comics by John Wagner
Fictional dinosaurs
Dinosaurs in comics
1984 comics debuts
British comics characters